Habibur Rahman Milon (193514 June 2015) was a Bangladeshi journalist. He was awarded the Ekushey Padak award in 2012 by the government of Bangladesh.

Career
Milon served as an advisory editor of The Daily Ittefaq. He also worked for the Daily Sangbad, Dainik Paygam, Dainik Azad, and Dainik Bangla.

Awards
 Jatir Janok Award
 Shaheed Suhrawardi Award
 BFUJ Award 
 Barrister A Rasul Gold Medal
 Ekushey Padak (2012)

References

1935 births
2015 deaths
Bangladeshi journalists
Recipients of the Ekushey Padak
Burials at Mirpur Martyred Intellectual Graveyard
People from Sarail Upazila